Nocebo is the fifth album by Finnish thrash metal band Stam1na. It was released on February 8, 2012. The album name refers to the nocebo effect. The album was composed mainly by Antti Hyyrynen and Pekka Olkkonen along with Kai-Pekka Kangasmäki, who made his composing début on their prior album called Viimeinen Atlantis, only this time composing two songs.

The lyrics were written by Hyyrynen, apart from "Tavastia palamaan!" which was by Finnish rap-artist Mariska. This was the first time Stam1na used an outside writer.

Stam1na also included a song in English, titled "Nomad", their first non-Finnish song since their early demo tapes. Their single "Valtiaan uudet vaateet" was made into a music video, directed by Tuomas Petsalo from Medialouhos.

The album cover is a picture of the tattoo that Jari Sinkkonen, the drummer of Finnish metal band Kotiteollisuus, has on his chest—presenting Stam1na's tooth logo.

Recording

Nocebo was produced, recorded and mixed by American producer Joe Barresi. The album was recorded in Petrax-studio in Hollola, Finland in September, 2011 and then mixed in Barresi's JHOC-studio in Pasadena, California.

Success

The album sold over 10,000 copies in Finland on the day it was released. It became the top album on Finland's official album listing of the week 7/2012.[6][7] They received their gold album on February 18, 2012, in Finnish Metal Expo- event where they also played the whole album live.[8] The album stayed in Finland's top 50 for twelve weeks.

Track listing
Lyrics: Antti Hyyrynen, except for Tavastia palamaan. Arrangements: Stam1na.

"Pirunpaska" – "Asafoetida" (Direct translation is "Devil's Shit") 4:01 (comp. Hyyrynen)
"Valtiaan uudet vaateet" – "Ruler's New Demands" 3:51 (comp. Pekka Olkkonen)
"Tavastia palamaan!" – "Burn the Tavastia!" 2:50 (comp. Kai-Pekka Kangasmäki, lyrics by Mariska)
"Puolikas ihminen" – "Half a Man" 3:25 (comp. Hyyrynen)
"Aivohalvaus" – "Apoplexy" 4:37 (comp. Kangasmäki)
"Rabies" – 4:02 (comp. Hyyrynen)
"Lepositeet" – "Limb Restraints" 6:21 (comp. Olkkonen)
"Nomad" – 4:43 (comp. Hyyrynen)
"Ei encorea" – "No Encore" 4:32 (comp. Olkkonen)
"Arveton on arvoton" – "Scarless Is Worthless" 4:42 (comp. Olkkonen)

Personnel

Stam1na
Antti Hyyrynen – vocals, guitar
Kai-Pekka Kangasmäki – bass guitar, backing vocals
Emil Lähteenmäki – keyboards
Pekka Olkkonen – solo guitar
Teppo Velin – drums

Featuring musicians
Markus Pajakkala – saxophone, bass clarinet and flute on "Pirunpaska"
Kuisma Aalto and Tuomo Saikkonen (along with Olkkonen and Kangasmäki) – "the wolves" on "Aivohalvaus" and "Rabies"

Charts

References

Stam1na albums
2012 albums